Justin Kleiner (born 1985) is an American musician and visual artist. He started his career in the visual arts, creating magazine illustrations, album covers, and showing in art galleries. Later, he began releasing music with his brother Matt Kleiner, as The Protist and as a solo artist. His music has been described as "ethereal, haunting, electronica."

Solo Discography

EPs
"Along the Way" (June 9, 2014)

Soundtracks
"Way of the Ocean: Australia" (July 10, 2012)

Singles
In The Wind (February 1, 2011)
Hills in Dreams (January 20, 2017)

Discography with Unseen Echo

Singles
Mysticeti (August 30, 2019)
Ancestor (June 28, 2019)

Discography with The Protist

EPs
Self-Titled (December 3, 2007)
Persona (March 9, 2009)

Singles
Dissolution (January 1, 2010)

Remixes
Years Around the Sun "Failing At Art" (August 1, 2009)
Years Around the Sun "Heart Delay" (August 1, 2009)

References

External links
 Official Website
 The Protist website
 Unseen Echo website

American electronic musicians
1985 births
Living people